Meigs Township is one of the twenty-five townships of Muskingum County, Ohio, United States.  The 2000 census found 173 people in the township.

Geography
Located in the southeastern corner of the county, it borders the following townships:
Rich Hill Township - north
Spencer Township, Guernsey County - northeast corner
Brookfield Township, Noble County - east
Bristol Township, Morgan County - south
Bloom Township, Morgan County - southwest corner
Blue Rock Township - west
Salt Creek Township - northwest corner

No municipalities are located in Meigs Township.

Name and history
Meigs Township was named after Meigs Creek. Statewide, the only other Meigs Township is located in Adams County.

By the 1830s, Meigs Township had three gristmills and four saw mills.

Government
The township is governed by a three-member board of trustees, who are elected in November of odd-numbered years to a four-year term beginning on the following January 1. Two are elected in the year after the presidential election and one is elected in the year before it. There is also an elected township fiscal officer, who serves a four-year term beginning on April 1 of the year after the election, which is held in November of the year before the presidential election. Vacancies in the fiscal officership or on the board of trustees are filled by the remaining trustees.

Demographics

References

External links
County website

Townships in Muskingum County, Ohio
Townships in Ohio